Kalborn is a village in the commune of Heinerscheid, in northern Luxembourg. , the village has a population of 54.

Heinerscheid
Villages in Luxembourg